Cottbus Air Base ( – "Airport Cottbus-North")  is a former military airport that is  north-west of Cottbus in Brandenburg, Germany.

History 
During World War II the air base in Cottbus was used by the Luftwaffe and during the 1970s and '80s by the National People's Army. Following German reunification until 2004, the air base was also used by the Bundeswehr.

Present 
The airport is currently closed to air traffic, although the concrete runway has been designated for use by cargo flights in the event of an emergency. There is an aerospace museum on site, and most of the runway is now used for a photovoltaic cell storage plant.

Future 
Having been bought by the local government in 2007, the city of Cottbus plans to turn the former air base into an industrial park, creating around 1,000 jobs.

References

External links 
 Cottbus Aerospace Museum 

Luftstreitkräfte airbases
Defunct airports in Germany
Buildings and structures in Cottbus
Airports in Brandenburg